Battle of Moclín may refer to:
 Battle of Moclín (1280) 
 Battle of Moclín (1808)